"Think I'm in Love" is a 1982 hit single by American rock singer Eddie Money from his album No Control. The song was written by Money and Randy Oda (who is perhaps best known otherwise for his collaborations with former Creedence Clearwater Revival member Tom Fogerty).  The song was released as a single and reached #16 on the Billboard Hot 100 and hit #1 on the Billboard Top Tracks chart.

The song was Money's first Top 40 hit in several years, and sparked a brief comeback for the artist. The song remains a popular track, and gets frequent airplay on classic rock radio stations.

Music video
The music video included elements from classic vampire movies (with Eddie Money cast as a quasi-Dracula character).  It was one of the most popular early MTV music videos.

In popular culture
The song has been featured in several movies, including Joe Dirt and Paul Blart: Mall Cop, the miniseries Waco and the fourth series opener of Cuckoo.

Chart history

Weekly charts

Year-end charts

See also
List of Billboard Mainstream Rock number-one songs of the 1980s

References

1982 songs
1982 singles
Eddie Money songs
Songs written by Eddie Money
Columbia Records singles